is a district of Bunkyo, Tokyo. It consists of five sub-areas, . In Koishikawa are located two well regarded gardens: the Koishikawa Botanical Garden (operated by the University of Tokyo) in Hakusan, and the Koishikawa Korakuen Garden in Kōraku.

The Koishikawa arsenal was an important military installation during the Meiji era.

Education
Bunkyo operates the local public elementary and middle schools.

Zoned elementary schools are: Kanatomi (金富小学校), Kubomachi (窪町小学校), Rekisen (礫川小学校), and Yanagicho (柳町小学校).

Zoned junior high schools are: No. 1 (第一中学校), No. 3 (第三中学校), and Meidai (茗台中学校).

Koishikawa High School is operated by the Tokyo Metropolitan Government Board of Education. In addition the metropolis operates the Koishikawa Secondary Education School.

References

Districts of Bunkyō